Iacopo Cernigoi (born 4 January 1995) is an Italian professional footballer who plays as a forward for  club Crotone.

Club career
He made his professional debut in the Serie B for Vicenza on 27 August 2016 in a game against Carpi.

On 18 January 2019, he signed with Salernitana and was immediately loaned out to Rieti. On 14 July 2019, he joined Sambenedettese on a season-long loan.

On 5 October 2020 he joined Juve Stabia on loan.

On 1 August 2021, he signed with Seregno. On 31 January 2022, Cernigoi was loaned to Pescara.

On 14 July 2022, Cernigoi moved to Feralpisalò on a three-year contract.

On 12 January 2023, Cernigoi signed a 1.5-year contract with Crotone.

References

External links
 
 

1995 births
Living people
Sportspeople from Mantua
Footballers from Lombardy
Italian footballers
Association football forwards
Serie B players
Serie C players
S.S.D. Pro Sesto players
U.S. 1913 Seregno Calcio players
Virtus Verona players
L.R. Vicenza players
Pisa S.C. players
Paganese Calcio 1926 players
U.S. Salernitana 1919 players
F.C. Rieti players
A.S. Sambenedettese players
S.S. Juve Stabia players
Delfino Pescara 1936 players
FeralpiSalò players
F.C. Crotone players